The Pomeranians are a German people native to the historical region of Pomerania. In modern times, its population inhabits Germany, including the state of Mecklenburg-Vorpommern. Nowadays there are about 10 million descendants of Germans in Brazil, a part of these Brazilians are of Pomeranian origin.

History 
In the High Middle Ages, groups of people migrated to Pomerania during the Ostsiedlung. These migrants, consisting of Germans from what is now Northwestern Germany, Danes, Dutch and Flemings, gradually outnumbered and assimilated the West Slavic tribes of the Rani, Liutizians and Slavic Pomeranians. The evolving society was speaking the East Pomeranian, Central Pomeranian and Mecklenburgisch-Vorpommersch dialects of Low German. Mostly German immigration continued until the 20th century. The Thirty Years' War caused a severe population drop: only one-third of the pre-war Pomeranian population survived. In the late 19th and early 20th century, many Pomeranians emigrated to prospering West German industrial centers or overseas during the Ostflucht. Low German was gradually replaced by Standard German, though spoken with an accent. After World War II, most of the former Province of Pomerania became Polish, and nearly all Pomeranians living east of the Oder-Neisse line fled or were expelled to post-war Germany. Therefore, Pomeranians today live not only in Western Pomerania but are dispersed all over Germany and other countries.

References

Pomerania
Ethnic groups in Germany